West Leisenring is an unincorporated community in Fayette County, Pennsylvania, United States. West Leisenring has a post office, with ZIP code 15489, which opened on December 27, 1882.

References

Unincorporated communities in Fayette County, Pennsylvania
Unincorporated communities in Pennsylvania